A mausoleum is an external free-standing building constructed as a monument enclosing the interment space or burial chamber of a deceased person or people. A mausoleum without the person's remains is called a cenotaph. A mausoleum may be considered a type of tomb, or the tomb may be considered to be within the mausoleum.

Overview
The word mausoleum (from Greek μαυσωλείον) derives from the Mausoleum at Halicarnassus (near modern-day Bodrum in Turkey), the grave of King Mausolus, the Persian satrap of Caria, whose large tomb was one of the Seven Wonders of the Ancient World.

Historically, mausolea were, and still may be, large and impressive constructions for a deceased leader or other person of importance. However, smaller mausolea soon became popular with the gentry and nobility in many countries. In the Roman Empire, these were often in necropoles or along roadsides: the via Appia Antica retains the ruins of many private mausolea for kilometres outside Rome. When Christianity became dominant, mausolea were out of use.

Later, mausolea became particularly popular in Europe and its colonies during the early modern and modern periods. A single mausoleum may be permanently sealed. A mausoleum encloses a burial chamber either wholly above ground or within a burial vault below the superstructure. This contains the body or bodies, probably within sarcophagi or interment niches. Modern mausolea may also act as columbaria (a type of mausoleum for cremated remains) with additional cinerary urn niches. Mausolea may be located in a cemetery, a churchyard or on private land.

In the United States, the term may be used for a burial vault below a larger facility, such as a church. The Cathedral of Our Lady of the Angels in Los Angeles, California, for example, has 6,000 sepulchral and cinerary urn spaces for interments in the lower level of the building. It is known as the "crypt mausoleum". In Europe, these underground vaults are sometimes called crypts or catacombs.

Notable mausoleums

Africa
Mausoleum of Mohammed V
Bourguiba mausoleum
El Alia Cemetery, Mausoleum of the Late President, Algeria.
The Dr. John Garang De Mabior mausoleum in Juba, South Sudan.
Mastabas dating from ancient Egypt.
Agostinho Neto's Mausoleum in Luanda, Angola.
Mausolée (Pyramide) du Président Mathieu Kerekou, Natitingou, Benin.
Mausolée du Guide Suprême du Patriotisme, Gitega, Burundi.
Omar Bongo's Mausoleum (A replica of the Mausoleum of Mohammed V)  in Franceville, Gabon.
Léon M'ba's Memorial Mausoleum in Libreville, Gabon.
Kwame Nkrumah Mausoleum
Atta Mills's Mausoleum at Asomdwee Park in Accra, Ghana.
Burma Camp Military Cemetery in Accra, Ghana.
Mausoleum of Late President Levy Mwanawasa, Frederick Chiluba and Michael Sata at Embassy Park Presidential Burial in Lusaka, Zambia.
Domoni Mosque Mausoleum Indoor inside first president of Comoros, Ahmed Abdallah's Mausoleum.
Marien Ngouabi's mausoleum and Pierre Savorgnan de Brazza's mausoleum in Brazzaville, The Republic of Congo.
Mausoleum of the late president Felix Houphouet-Boigny in Yamoussoukro, Côte d'Ivoire.
Laurent Kabila's mausoleum in Kinshasa, The Democratic Republic of Congo.
Mausolée de Joseph Kasa-Vubu, Singini, Tshela, Kongo Central, The Democratic Republic of Congo.
The pyramids of ancient Egypt and Nubian pyramids are also types of mausolea.
Gamal Abdel Nasser Mosque, is the Mausoleum of Gamal Abdel Nasser, in Cairo, Egypt.
Unknown Soldier Memorial (Egypt)
Royal Mausoleum of Mauretania
Al Hussein Mosque, Cairo – Holy Shrine and mausoleum, and purported grave of the Islamic prophet Muhammad's grandson.
Qalawun Mausoleum is the Mausoleum of Qalawun, Located in Cairo, Egypt, it was regarded by scholars as the second most beautiful medieval mausoleum ever to be built.
Jedars - thirteen ancient monumental Berber mausoleums located south of Tiaret.
Palm Grove Cemetery, Monrovia, Liberia.
National Hall, Mausoleum of the Late President William Tubman in Monrovia, Montserrado, Liberia.
Late President Eyadema's Family Mausoleum in Kara, Togo.
Kamuzu Banda Mausoleum, in Lilongwe, Malawi. 
Dr. Bingu wa Mutharika, President of Malawi built a mausoleum in which his late first wife and Bingu himself are buried.
Meles Zenawi's grave in Holy Trinity Cathedral, Addis Ababa, Ethiopia.
King Sobhuza II Memorial Park, Lobamba, Eswatini.
Julius Nyerere's mausoleum in Mwalimu Nyerere Museum Centre, Butiama, Tanzania.
The Heroes Square, Maputo, Mozambique.
Amilcar Cabral's mausoleum in Bissau, Guinea-Bissau.
 Mausoleum of the Late President of Kenya Mzee Jomo Kenyatta in Nairobi, Kenya.
 Jaramogi Oginga Odinga Mausoleum, Bondo, Kenya.
 Camayanne Mausoleum and contains the tombs of Guinea national hero Samori Ture, Sekou Toure and Alfa Yaya in Grand Mosque of Conakry.
 Nnamdi Azikiwe's burial site, Onitsha, Nigeria.
 Abubakar Tafawa Balewa's tomb, Bauchi, Nigeria.
 Mausoleum of Obafemi Awolowo, Ogun State, Nigeria.
 Mausoleum of Sani Abacha, Kano, Nigeria.
 National Heroes Acre in Harare, Zimbabwe.

Asia, Eastern, Southern, and Southeast

Bangladesh
Mausoleum of Kazi Nazrul Islam
Mausoleum of Lalon Shah
Mausoleum of Sheikh Mujibur Rahman
Mausoleum of Three Leaders
Mausoleum of Ziaur Rahman

China
List of mausoleums of Chinese monarchs
Mausoleum of the First Qin Emperor biggest underground mausoleum
The pyramids of ancient China are also types of mausolea.
Qianling Mausoleum in China, houses the remains of Emperor Gaozong of Tang and the ruling Empress Wu Zetian, along with 17 others in auxiliary tombs.
Tomb and Mausoleum of Genghis Khan in Ordos City, Inner Mongolia.
 Imperial Tombs of the Ming and Qing Dynasties
 Ming Xiaoling Mausoleum, Nanjing
 Thirteen Imperial Mausoleums of Ming Dynasty Emperors, Beijing
 Fuling Tomb, Shenyang
 Zhao Mausoleum (Qing Dynasty)
 Eastern Qing Tombs
 Western Qing Tombs
Sun Yat-sen Mausoleum, Nanjing.
Mausoleum of Yuan Shikai, Beiguan, Anyang.
Mausoleum of Mao Zedong, Beijing.

India
Akbar's tomb at Agra, India
Taj Mahal at Agra, India
Qutb Shahi Tombs at Hyderabad, India
Gol Gumbaz at Bijapur, India
Humayun's Tomb at Delhi, India

Indonesia
Grave of Sukarno at Blitar, East Java, Indonesia
Astana Giribangun at Karanganyar, Central Java, Indonesia
Imogiri complex in Imogiri, Central Java is the cemetery for Mataram royals and the Hamengkubuwana Royals of Yogyakarta and Pakubuwono of Surakarta
Grave of Bung Hatta at Jakarta, Indonesia
Mausoleum O. G. Khouw at Jakarta, Indonesia
Grave of Kyai Langgeng at Magelang, Central Java, Indonesia

Japan
Mausoleums of Emperors of Japan
Mozu Tombs in Sakai, Osaka Prefecture, Japan
Fukakusa no kita no Misasagi (深草北陵) in Kyoto, Japan
Sennyū-ji, Kyoto, Japan
Tsuki no wa no misasagi (月輪陵)
Fushimi Momoyama no Misasagi (伏見桃山陵) in Kyoto, Japan
Musashi Imperial Graveyard, is a mausoleum complex at Hachiōji, Tokyo, Japan
Toyokuni Shrine at Higashiyama-ku, Kyoto, Japan. Mausoleum of Kampaku Toyotomi Hideyoshi, which was later destroyed by the Tokugawa clan.
Nikkō Tōshō-gū at Nikkō, Tochigi Prefecture, Japan. It is part of the "Shrines and Temples of Nikkō", Mausoleum of Tokugawa Ieyasu, Tokugawa shōguns.
Rinnō-ji at Nikkō, Tochigi Prefecture, Japan. The temple also administers the Taiyū-in Reibyō (大猷院霊廟), which is the mausoleum of Tokugawa Iemitsu, the third Tokugawa shōgun. Together with Nikkō Tōshō-gū and Futarasan Shrine.
Zuihōden at Sendai, Miyagi Prefecture, Japan is the mausoleum complex of Date Masamune and his heirs, daimyō of the Sendai Domain
Tamaudun, at Shuri, Okinawa, Japan

Malaysia 

Makam Pahlawan at National Mosque of Malaysia, Kuala Lumpur, Malaysia.
Makam Diraja Mahmoodiah at Bukit Mahmoodiah in Jalan Mahmoodiah, Johor Bahru, Johor, Malaysia.
Hang Kasturi Mausoleum at Jonker Walk, Melaka City, Melaka, Malaysia.
Kedah Royal Mausoleum at Langgar, Kota Setar District, Kedah, Malaysia.
Kelantan Royal Mausoleum
Al-Ghufran Royal Mausoleum at Bukit Chandan in Jalan Istana, Kuala Kangsar, Malaysia.
Hang Jebat Mausoleum in Melaka City, Melaka, Malaysia.
Shah Alam Royal Mausoleum
Tun Teja Mausoleum in Merlimau, Jasin District, Melaka, Malaysia.
Seri Menanti Royal Mausoleum
Sultan Abdul Samad Mausoleum in Jugra, Banting, Selangor, Malaysia.

Pakistan
Tomb of Jahangir at Shahdara, near Lahore, Pakistan.
Mazar-e-Quaid at Karachi, Pakistan
Tomb of Allama Iqbal at Lahore, Pakistan
Data Durbar at Lahore, Pakistan
Bhutto family mausoleum, Garhi Khuda Bakhsh, Sindh, Pakistan

Philippines

Rizal Monument at Rizal Park in Manila, Philippines, houses the remains of Dr. Jose Rizal, national hero of the Philippines.
Aguinaldo Shrine in Kawit, Cavite, Philippines.
Mausoleum of the Veterans of the Revolution, enshrining participants in the 1896 revolution against the Spanish Empire.
Quezon Memorial, in Quezon City, Philippines, houses the remains of President Manuel L. Quezon and his wife, Aurora.
Marcos Museum and Mausoleum in Batac, Ilocos Norte, Philippines, housing the remains of President Ferdinand Marcos.

Taiwan
National Chiang Kai-shek Memorial Hall, Taipei, Taiwan.
National Dr. Sun Yat-sen Memorial Hall, Taipei, Taiwan.
Mausoleum of Late President Chiang Kai-shek, Taoyuan, Taiwan.
Mausoleum of Late President Chiang Ching-kuo, Taoyuan, Taiwan.
Chen Tsyr-shiou Memorial Park, Former Mausoleum and Memorial of Late Vice President Chen Cheng, Taishan District, New Taipei, Taiwan.

Others
Konbaung tombs are a collection of mausoleums built by Konbaung Dynasty kings in Mandalay, Amarapura, and Inwa, Myanmar.
Kandawmin Garden Mausolea, Myanmar.
Martyrs' Mausoleum, Myanmar.
Royal Cemetery at Wat Ratchabophit, Thailand
Royal Tombs of the Joseon Dynasty, Korea
Kim Koo Museum and Hyochang Park, Seoul, Republic of Korea (South Korea)
Bandaranaike family Estate in Horagolla Bandaranaike Samadhi, Sri Lanka
Kurjey Lhakhang, Bumthang Valley, Bumthang District, Bhutan
Silver Pagoda, Phnom Penh, Cambodia
Ho Chi Minh Mausoleum, Hanoi, Vietnam
Kumsusan Palace of the Sun or Kim Il-sung Mausoleum, Pyongyang, Democratic People's Republic of Korea (North Korea)

Asia, western
Al-Khazneh at Petra, Jordan
Mausoleum of Maussollos at Halicarnassus
Mausoleum of Cyrus the Great in Pasargadae, Iran.
Naqsh-e Rustam at Persepolis Iran, Tombs of Persian Achaemenid kings (522-486 BCE).
Tomb of Ferdowsi in Mashhad, Iran.
Tomb of Hafez (Hāfezieh) in Shiraz, Iran
The Shrine of the Báb and the Shrine of Bahá'u'lláh in Haifa and Acre, Israel, respectively.
Imam Husayn Mosque, Karbala – according to Shī‘ah belief, the head and body of Husayn ibn Ali, along with all others who fell at the Battle of Karbala are buried here.
Imam Reza shrine in Mashhad, Iran
The Mausoleum of Khomeini in Tehran, Iran
Anıtkabir mausoleum of Atatürk the founder of the Republic of Turkey at Ankara, Turkey
Celal Bayar Mausoleum in Bursa, Turkey
Adnan Menderes's Mausoleum, in Istanbul, Turkey
Turgut Özal's Mausoleum, in Istanbul, Turkey
Süleyman Demirel Mausoleum in Atabey, Turkey 
Mausoleum of Yasser Arafat in Ramallah, West Bank
Sheikh Zayed Mosque in Abu Dhabi, United Arab Emirates

Europe

Bismarck Mausoleum outside Friedrichsruh in northern Germany
Hamilton Mausoleum at Hamilton in Scotland
House of Karageorgevich Mausoleum, St. George's Church, Oplenac in Topola, Serbia
Royal Mausoleum and the Duchess of Kent's Mausoleum at Frogmore, England
Peter and Paul Cathedral in St. Petersburg, Russia
Cathedral of the Archangel in Moscow, Russia
Lenin's Mausoleum in Moscow, Russia
Cathedral of Saint Domnius in Split, Croatia
Lajos Batthyány's Mausoleum in Budapest, Hungary
Mausoleum of Augustus in Rome, Italy.
Pantheon, Rome in Italy
Mausoleum of Hadrian in Rome, Italy
Mausoleum of Theodoric in Ravenna, Italy
Mausoleum of Galla Placidia in Ravenna, Italy
Mausoleum of Marasesti in Marasesti, Romania
Pyramid of Tirana in Tirana, Albania
Batenberg Mausoleum in Sofia, Bulgaria
Trentham Mausoleum near Stoke-on-Trent, England
Panthéon, Paris in France
Les Invalides in France
Valle de los Caídos, in San Lorenzo del Escorial, Spain
Imperial Crypt in Austria
Church of Our Lady of Laeken in Belgium
Oplenac Mausoleum in Topola, Serbia, the Mausoleum of the Serbian and Yugoslav Royal House of Karađorđević
National Pantheon / Church of Santa Engrácia in Lisbon, Portugal
Mausoleum of Njegoš in Lovćen, Montenegro
Wilhelm II Mausoleum in Doorn, Netherlands
Juselius Mausoleum in Finland
Barclay de Tolly Mausoleum in Estonia

South America

Argentina 

 La Recoleta Cemetery, Buenos Aires
 Buenos Aires Metropolitan Cathedral, mausoleum of José de San Martín
 Mausoleum of Néstor Kirchner, Río Gallegos, Santa Cruz
 Cathedral of La Plata, mausoleum of Dardo Rocha

Bolivia 

 Cathedral Basilica of Our Lady of Peace, La Paz, mausoleum of Andrés de Santa Cruz
 General Cemetery of Santa Cruz
 Cementerio General de Cochabamba, mausoleum of “general del pueblo” René Barrientos Ortuño

Brazil 
Obelisk of São Paulo, mausoleum to the heroes of Constitutionalist Revolution in São Paulo, São Paulo
Chico Xavier mausoleum in Uberaba, Minas Gerais
São João Batista Cemetery, Rio de Janeiro, Rio de Janeiro
Monument to the Independence of Brazil in São Paulo
JK Memorial in Brasília, Federal District
Convent of Santo Antônio, Rio de Janeiro

Chile 

 Altar de la Patria of Chile
 Cementerio General de Santiago, Chile

Colombia 

 Central Cemetery of Bogotá, Colombia

Ecuador 

 San Diego Cemetery, Quito
 Cathedral of Quito
 Mausoleo en el Centro Cívico Ciudad Alfaro, Montecristi, Ecuador

Paraguay 

 National Pantheon of the Heroes

Peru 
Panteón de los Próceres
Presbitero Maestro mausoleum and museum in Lima
Cathedral Basilica of St. John the Apostle and Evangelist, Lima

Uruguay 

 Artigas Mausoleum, mausoleum of José Gervasio Artigas

Venezuela 

 National Pantheon of Venezuela, mausoleum of Simón Bolívar

North America

Canada
Eaton family mausoleum at Mount Pleasant Cemetery in Toronto, Ontario
Hart Massey's mausoleum at Mount Pleasant Cemetery in Toronto, Ontario
Sir Henry Pellatt's mausoleum at Forest Lawn in Toronto, Ontario

Cuba 

 Santa Ifigenia Cemetery, Santiago de Cuba

Dominican Republic 

 Altar de la Patria, mausoleum to the Founding Fathers of the Dominican Republic
 National Pantheon of the Dominican Republic

El Salvador 

 Los Ilustres Cemetery
 San Salvador Cathedral

Guatemala 

 Guatemala City General Cemetery

Haiti 

 Haiti’s National Cemetery in Port-au-Prince, where François Duvalier, who ruled from 1957 to 1971, is buried

Honduras 

 Cementerio General, Trujillo

Mexico 

 El Ángel Victory column and mausoleum to the heroes of the Mexican Independence in Mexico City
 Monumento a la Revolución monument commemorating and mausoleum to the heroes of the Mexican Revolution in Mexico City
 Mexico City Metropolitan Cathedral, Mexico City
 Panteon San Fernando, Mexico City
 Jardines Del Humaya, a cemetery with opulent multi-story and air-conditioned mausoleums of Mexican drug cartel members

Nicaragua 

 Cementerio General Occidental, Managua
 Central Park, Managua

Panama 

 Omar Torrijos Mausoleum, Amador, Panama City

United States
Henry Flagler's mausoleum in St. Augustine, Florida
Presidential memorials in the United States and Presidents' graves of the United States
Grant's Tomb in New York, New York
Abraham Lincoln's tomb in Springfield, Illinois
MacArthur Memorial in Norfolk, Virginia
Miles Mausoleum in Arlington National Cemetery
Ferncliff Cemetery and Mausoleum in Hartsdale, New York
Forest Lawn Memorial Park in Glendale, California
Queen of Heaven Mausoleum in Queen of Heaven Cemetery, Hillside, Illinois
Rose Hills Memorial Park, Whittier, California
Rose Chapel Mausoleum in Roseland Park Cemetery, Berkley, Michigan
Shrine of the Good Shepherd Chapel Mausoleum in Green Bay, Wisconsin
Wilhelm's Portland Memorial Funeral Home in Portland, Oregon
Tacoma Mausoleum in Tacoma, Washington
Tombs of the Uga mascots inside Sanford Stadium in Athens, Georgia
Brigadier General Egbert Ludovicus Viele's Egyptian-style pyramid mausoleum in West Point, New York
Rapper XXXTentacion's mausoleum at The Gardens of Boca Raton in Boca Raton, Florida
Mausoleo a los Heroes de El Polvorín, at Cementerio Civil de Ponce in Ponce, Puerto Rico

Oceania
Massey Memorial in Wellington, New Zealand where New Zealand Prime Minister William Massey and his wife are interred.
Savage Memorial at Bastion Point in Auckland, New Zealand where New Zealand Prime Minister Michael Joseph Savage is interred.

See also
 List of types of funerary monument
 Morgue or mortuary
 National Cemetery
 Ohel (grave)
 Sepulchre
 Guard mounting

Notes 
The plurals mausoleums and mausolea are both used in English, although mausoleums is more common.

Footnotes

External links 

 Mausolea and Monuments Trust, gazetteer of mausolea in England
 Marvelous Mausoleums Around The World – slideshow at The Huffington Post

 
Burial monuments and structures